Tontodonati is an Italian surname. Notable people with the surname include:

Federico Tontodonati (born 1989), Italian racewalker
Giuseppe Tontodonati (1917–1989), Italian poet
Kiri Tontodonati (born 1994), Italian rower
Letizia Tontodonati (born 1999), Italian rower
Mario Tontodonati (1923–2009), Italian footballer
Matteo Tontodonati (born 1963), Italian rower
Mauro Tontodonati (born 1991), Italian rower
Valentino Tontodonati (born 1959), Italian rower
Valentino Tontodonati (born 1994), Italian rower

Italian-language surnames